"Relax Your Mind" featuring Faith Evans, is the second single by R&B vocal group Boyz II Men from the album Full Circle. This was the last single that included bass singer, Michael McCary.

Track listing

CD single 
 "Relax Your Mind" (Radio mix) — 4:06
 "Relax Your Mind" (Instrumental) — 4:05

Vinyl 12" single 
 "Relax Your Mind" (LP version) — 4:06
 "Relax Your Mind" (Instrumental) — 4:05
 "Relax Your Mind" (Album version) — 4:02
 "Relax Your Mind" (Acapella) — 4:05

Charts

References

External links 
  (Vinyl, 12", 33 ⅓ RPM)

2002 songs
Boyz II Men songs
Arista Records singles
Songs written by Carlos McKinney
2002 singles
Songs written by El DeBarge